Imploding the Mirage is the sixth studio album by American rock band the Killers. It was released on August 21, 2020, by Island Records in the United States and internationally by EMI. To date, it is the band's only album without lead guitarist Dave Keuning, who took an indefinite hiatus (ending in 2021) from the band in 2017. Guitar parts are covered by Killers bassist Mark Stoermer, producer Jonathan Rado, and a variety of guest musicians including Lindsey Buckingham (Fleetwood Mac) and Adam Granduciel (The War on Drugs).

The album was preceded by the lead single "Caution" released on March 12, 2020, the second single "My Own Soul's Warning" released on June 17, 2020, and the promo singles "Fire in Bone" released on April 24, 2020 and "Dying Breed", released on August 14, 2020.

The band embarked on a world tour in support of the album starting in April 2022 and which will run until December of the same year.

Background
The band formally announced the album on social media on November 15, 2019. Frontman Brandon Flowers told NME that the band went to Utah to record part of the album as it was where Flowers "fell in love with music for the first time", also saying that it was "interesting to be there again and hear some of that music with the geography matching the sensation. Some of that stuff is starting to resurface and a lot of that had to do with synthesizer music. It's always been part of our DNA but it's definitely creeping up."

Recording
Imploding the Mirage was recorded in various locations, including in Los Angeles, Las Vegas and Park City, Utah, and produced by Canadian producer Shawn Everett, and Jonathan Rado of the band Foxygen. The duo pushed The Killers to think beyond what people might expect of them. Drummer Ronnie Vannucci noted: "It kind of felt uncomfortable in a really special way, I remember thinking, 'I don't know what's going to happen and I like it.'"

The album is the band's first not to feature founding guitarist Dave Keuning, who took a step back from the band in a touring and recording capacity following the release of their previous studio album, Wonderful Wonderful (2017). Flowers and Vannucci reached out to Keuning to rejoin them in the studio to record Imploding the Mirage: "When we started working the schedule out, we asked [Dave] if it worked for him and he was like, 'Maybe, I don't know'. Well, we're going to go ahead and do this because we feel good and we feel creative. Let's strike. We didn't really hear from him, except when it came to making a video. He was like, 'If you guys want me in the video…' Well, I'm not sure that makes any sense either! Video? How about some guitar?" Flowers elaborated: "He's just happy to be in San Diego and doesn't really want to venture out of there. If he comes for a week and we don't tap into the universe, that frustrates him a lot. He's kind of just spending time with his family and I think he's content doing that right now." The following year, Keuning discussed his own reasons for not taking part in the recording sessions: "I just needed a break from everything. [Imploding the Mirage] was probably just as busy of a schedule as touring for ten or eleven months. That record took a long time to record. I feel like it took a year and a half. Only they would know, but I feel like it took a while. I just... we were kind of at a stalemate. [...] If it was recorded in San Diego, I probably could have been a part of it. I wasn’t ready to work out of Vegas or Utah for a year and a half."

Bass guitarist Mark Stoermer, who has been on touring hiatus from the band since 2016, contributed both bass and guitar to the album. Regarding Stoermer's involvement, Vannucci noted: "Mark's awesome in so many ways. We'd tell [Dave and Mark], 'This is the schedule, we're renting a house for six months, come out, whenever you want, we're there every day'. Mark came out to the house one time and to Los Angeles and it was great. It was on his own terms and was very productive. He played bass on some songs, played guitar on some songs, and even though he wasn't in the room we'd send him mixes and he'd be involved."

The album features contributions from Lindsey Buckingham ("Caution"), k.d. lang ("Lightning Fields"), Weyes Blood ("My God"), Adam Granduciel from the War on Drugs ("Blowback"), Blake Mills ("Caution") and Lucius ("Caution" and "My God").

Composition
Musically, Imploding the Mirage has been described as heartland rock, pop rock, alternative rock, synth-pop, pop, arena rock, new wave, and synth-rock.

After contributing to five songs on the band's fifth studio album, Wonderful Wonderful, Australian musician and songwriter Alex Cameron returned to co-write three tracks on Imploding the Mirage.

Artwork
The album cover is Dance of the Wind and Storm by American artist Thomas Blackshear. The album's artwork was decided upon during the recording process and became a source of visual inspiration in the studio, with Flowers noting: "They just look like gods. I just started to see a path open up in what these two people could represent for me. We blew up terrible lo-res versions of them and stuck them up in the studio. I would go to them when I needed help with lyrics and when we needed help with sonics, or [to decide] which songs were making the record. [The artwork] became a member of the band. There are direct lines that will just take you to the painting."

Promotion

Live performances
The Killers performed tracks from the album live for CBS This Morning, The Ellen DeGeneres Show, Jimmy Kimmel Live!,  The Tonight Show Starring Jimmy Fallon, The Late Show with Stephen Colbert,  and Good Morning America.

The band also appeared on the covers of NME and Music Week.

Singles
The lead single, "Caution", was released on March 12, 2020, and reached number one on Billboards Alternative Airplay and Rock Airplay charts. The second single, "Fire in Bone", was released on April 24, 2020. The third single, "My Own Soul's Warning", was released on June 17, 2020 and reached the top ten on Billlboard'''s Alternative Airplay and Rock Airplay charts and the fourth single, "Dying Breed", was released on August 14, 2020.

Critical receptionImploding the Mirage received generally positive reviews from critics. At Metacritic, which assigns a normalized rating out of 100 to reviews from mainstream critics, the album has a score of 76 out of 100, which indicates "generally favorable reviews" based on 22 reviews. AllMusic's Neil Z. Yeung stated that "the Killers strike gold" on the album, writing that it is "more than just one of their best albums, but a triumphant and invigorated rut-reversal that shines with a hard-won confidence." DIYs Sarah Jamieson called the album "rich and invigorating" and stated that it "proves they're still one of our most treasured bands for a reason". Writing for NME, Mark Beaumont called the album "a raised fist to the future" and "another dazzling statement of ultra-modern pomp, and one arguably even more in step with new generations of alt-rock" in a five-star review.

AccoladesPitchfork ranked "Caution" the 94th best song of 2020.Uproxx listed "My Own Soul's Warning" as the 5th best song of 2020. NME listed it as the 14th best song of 2020.

Commercial performanceImploding the Mirage debuted at number eight on the US Billboard 200 (and number one on the US Billboard Rock Albums chart), earning 37,000 album-equivalent units (including 30,000 pure album sales) in its first week. In the United Kingdom, it debuted atop the UK Albums Chart with first-week sales of 50,391 copies, becoming the third fastest-selling album of the year so far (behind Lady Gaga's Chromatica and Kylie Minogue's Disco). It also marks the Killers' sixth consecutive UK chart-topper and Flowers' eighth. The album also topped the ARIA Albums Chart in Australia.

Track listing
All tracks are produced by Jonathan Rado and Shawn Everett, except where noted.

Notes
 "Blowback" contains samples from "Your Love", performed by Frankie Knuckles and Jamie Principle.
 "Dying Breed" contains excerpts from "Hallogallo", performed by Neu!, and "Moonshake", performed by Can.

Personnel
Credits adapted from the liner notes of Imploding the Mirage''.

Studios

 Subtle McNugget Studios (Los Angeles) – recording, mixing 
 Electro-Vox Recording Studios (Los Angeles) – recording 
 Battle Born Studios (Las Vegas) – recording 
 Effie Street Studios (Los Angeles) – mixing 
 Assault and Battery 1 (London) – mixing 
 Ariel's Studio – mixing 
 The Lodge (New York City) – mastering

The Killers
 Brandon Flowers – vocals ; synth ; organ ; glockenspiel ; marimba synth ; guitar 
 Ronnie Vannucci Jr. – drums ; percussion ; guitar ; timpani ; marimba 
 Mark Stoermer – guitar ; bass ; E-Bow ; bass VI

Additional musicians

 Bobby Lee Parker – guitar 
 Jonathan Rado – bass ; organ, cello ; guitar ; string synth ; piano ; slide guitar ; acoustics ; E-Bow ; harmonica ; 12-string ; celeste ; acoustic guitar ; synth ; drones ; Emulator, horns, bagpipes ; Fairlight ; fretless bass ; Linn ; marimba, vibraphone 
 Rob Moose – strings 
 Roger Joseph Manning Jr. – keys 
 Brian D'Addario – acoustic guitar 
 Shawn Everett – programming ; drones ; Emulator 
 Natalie Mering – outro vocals ; additional vocals ; chorus and bridge vocals ; vocals 
 Adam Granduciel – keys,  manipulation 
 Lindsey Buckingham – guitar 
 Blake Mills – guitar, bass, bass VI 
 Lucius – background vocals 
 k.d. lang – vocals 
 Drew Erickson – piano ; strings 
 Stuart Price – synths, guitar, bass 
 Benji Lysaght – guitar 
 Ariel Rechtshaid – guitar, bass, Linn 
 Tommy King – synth, pan flute

Technical

 Jonathan Rado – production 
 Shawn Everett – production, recording, mixing 
 Ivan Wayman – engineering 
 Robert Root – engineering 
 Ariel Rechtshaid – mixing ; production 
 Dave Shiffman – mixing 
 Flood – mixing 
 Stuart Price – production 
 Alan Moulder – mixing 
 Emily Lazar – mastering

Artwork
 Brandon Flowers – art direction
 Joe Spix – art direction, design
 Sandy Brummels – art direction
 Thomas Blackshear II – paintings

Charts

Weekly charts

Year-end charts

Certifications

See also
 List of number-one albums of 2020 (Australia)
 List of UK Albums Chart number ones of the 2020s

References

2020 albums
Albums produced by Ariel Rechtshaid
Albums produced by Jonathan Rado
Albums produced by Shawn Everett
Albums produced by Stuart Price
Albums recorded at Electro-Vox Recording Studios
Island Records albums
The Killers albums